Jeff Prescott (born 1969, Olean, New York) is an American amateur wrestler, who won two NCAA division 1 championships at Penn State University and was the first Penn State Most Outstanding Wrestler (MOW) of the NCAA tournament. He currently runs his own training center in Limestone, New York, and serves as a coach and mentor to youth and high school wrestlers in the Western New York and North East Pennsylvania areas.

High school career and accolades
Prescott was a three time New York State Champion while wrestling for Olean High School in south-western New York. He was also an MOW for the NYSPHSAA tournament as well as a USA High School All American, held the record for most wins in NY from 1986-2000  and continued his career to Penn State University. There, he was a 2x NCAA Division 1 champion, a University Freestyle champion, a Junior World Champion, and Most Outstanding Wrestler at the NCAA tournament.

He had limited success on the professional circuit, including several Olympic qualification tries and training runs.

In 2007, Prescott was also inducted into the EWL Hall-of-Fame in Cleveland, Ohio.

Coaching
Prescott coached the Jupiter Christian High School wrestling team (in Jupiter, Florida) to a state championship in 2006. He has also coached many individual wrestlers to varying success. He currently runs and coaches his own school in Buffalo, New York.

Entertainment
He also appeared on a short lived television show, Real Pro Wrestling, on the NY Outrage Team. Prescott also produces a line of wrestling education DVDs.

Awards
Section 6 4 time Champion (NY) (1984, 1985, 1986, 1987)

NYS 3x State Champion (1985, 1986, 1987)

NYS MOW (1986)

USA High School All American

3x NCAA All American (1990, 1991, 1992)

2x NCAA D1 Champion (1991, 1992)

University Freestyle Champion (1991)

Junior World Champion

NCAA D1 MOW (1991)

EWL Hall of Fame Inductee (2007)

References

External links
Wrestlingstats.com
Section6.elb.org

1969 births
Living people
American wrestlers
People from Olean, New York